Coroiești is a commune in Vaslui County, Western Moldavia, Romania. It is composed of seven villages: Chilieni, Coroiești, Coroieștii de Sus, Hreasca, Mireni, Movileni and Păcurărești.

References

Communes in Vaslui County
Localities in Western Moldavia